The Kyocera C4700, also referred to as the Kyocera Cabo, is a touch slate phone from Kyocera with support for social media. It was shown first at the Expo Comm Wireless Japan 2011 show in Tokyo. Features include:
LCD resistive touch color display - 240 x 320 pixels - 2.8"
Web access: HTML and WAP 2.0 browser
Social media: Facebook, Twitter and YouTube
Email, including Hotmail, Yahoo and Gmail
GPS locator
Stereo Bluetooth
FM radio
MicroSD card up to 8 GB
Java MIDP 2.1

Other technical data:
Battery life: Talk: up to 4 hours, Standby: up to 400 hours on GSM, 350 hours on UMTS
 Bands: UMTS: 850/1900 MHz, GSM: 850/900/1800/1900 MHz

Carriers
 Movilnet

References

Kyocera mobile phones